IranDalan may refer to:
Bedrettin Dalan (b. 1941), mayor of Istanbul
Dalan, Khuzestan, a village in Khuzestan Province, Iran
Dalan, Kurdistan, a village in Kurdistan Province, Iran
Dalan-e Gowhargan, a village in Kohgiluyeh and Boyer-Ahmad Province, Iran

China
 Dalan, Luxi (达岚镇), a town of Luxi County, Hunan, China.

Others
 Dalan, arcaded room with one open side overlooking a courtyard in Mughal architecture or Indian architecture
 Dalan Musson, American screenwriter
 Dalan (play), a Marathi play, featuring Amey Wagh and produced by the Natak Company